The Airbus A330 is a wide-body twin-engine jet airliner made by Airbus.

The origin of the A330 dates to the 1970s as one of several conceived derivatives of Airbus's first airliner, the A300. The A330 was developed in parallel with the A340, which shared many common airframe components but differed in number of engines. Both airliners incorporated fly-by-wire flight control technology, first introduced on an Airbus aircraft with the A320, as well as the A320's six-display glass cockpit. In June 1987, after receiving orders from various customers, Airbus launched the A330 and A340. The A330 was Airbus's first airliner offered with the choice of three engines: General Electric, Pratt & Whitney, and Rolls-Royce.

The A330-300, the first variant, took its maiden flight in November 1992 and entered passenger service with Air Inter in January 1994. Responding to dwindling sales, Airbus followed up with the slightly shorter A330-200 variant in 1998, which has proved more popular. Subsequently, developed A330 variants include a dedicated freighter, the A330-200F, and a military tanker, the A330 MRTT. The A330 MRTT formed the basis of the proposed KC-45, entered into the U.S. Air Force's KC-X competition in conjunction with Northrop Grumman, where after an initial win, on appeal lost to Boeing's tanker.

Since its launch, the A330 has allowed Airbus to expand market share in wide-body airliners. Airlines have selected the A330 as a replacement for less economical trijets and versus rival twinjets. Boeing has offered variants of the 767 and 777 as competitors, along with the 787 which entered service in 2011. Airbus's A350 also shares this wide-body airliner market. As of November 2022, the A330's order book stood at 1,764, of which 1,555 had been delivered and 1,462 were in service. The largest operator is Delta Air Lines with 61 aircraft.

Airline operators
A list of operators of the Airbus A330, .

Military operators

As of August 2015, seven countries have placed order for a total 41 of Airbus A330 MRTTs, specialised for tanker operations: Australia, Saudi Arabia, United Arab Emirates, the United Kingdom, France, Singapore and South Korea.

Government operators

Following countries operate A330-200 for VIP use.
Armed Forces of the Republic of Kazakhstan – 1 in service
French Air and Space Force – 1 in service
Government of Turkey – 1 in service
Government of Thailand – 1 in service
Government of Malaysia – 1 in service
Royal Air Force – 1 in service
Qatar Amiri Flight – 2 in service

See also
List of Airbus A330 orders and deliveries

Footnotes
References

Bibliography
 
Airbus Orders and Deliveries

Operators
Airbus A330